The Unchanging Sea is a 1910 American drama film that was directed by  D. W. Griffith. A print of the film survives in the Library of Congress film archive.

Plot
The film starts with intertitles that reads “three fishers went sailing to the west, away to the west as the sun went down. Each thought on the woman who loved him best, and the women stood watching them out of the town.” A young married couple are enjoying life by going to the beach. They run into workers on the beach and they all seem in awe of the happy couple. The young couple goes back to the beach but the wife watches her husband go out to sea on a boat. She waves her husband and the other sailors bye and waits for them to return. Days go by and the wife and other wives go back to the beach to see if they’ve returned. Three corpses are laying in the ocean and brought back to land. The wife brings her baby back to the same beach waiting for her husband to return. Years go by and the baby is now a child and they still go to the beach waiting for his return. The daughter gets married to a young fisherman. The wife now old goes to the beach and just weeps. The couple reunites in the end after years.

Cast
 Arthur V. Johnson as The Husband
 Linda Arvidson as The Wife
 Gladys Egan as The Daughter as a young girl
 Mary Pickford as The Daughter as a young woman
 Charles West as The Daughter's Sweetheart
 Dell Henderson as Rescuer
 Kate Bruce as Villager
 George Nichols
 Frank Opperman
 Alfred Paget as Villager
 Dorothy West as Villager

See also
 List of American films of 1910
 1910 in film

References

External links

The Unchanging Sea on YouTube

1910 films
1910 drama films
1910 short films
American silent short films
American black-and-white films
Silent American drama films
Films directed by D. W. Griffith
1910s American films
Films based on works by Charles Kingsley